Upper Egypt is an album by American keyboardist and composer Wayne Horvitz' band Zony Mash recorded in 1999 and released on the independent Knitting Factory label.

Reception
The Allmusic review by Sean Westergaard awarded the album 4 stars stating "Upper Egypt demonstrates what can happen when four talented individuals act with one mind: a great record".

Track listing
All compositions by Wayne Horvitz except as indicated
 "Upper Egypt" (Pharoah Sanders) -4:24 
 "Spice Rack" - 5:09 
 "The End of Time" - 5:20 
 "Big Shoe" (Bill Frisell) - 6:24 
 "FYI" - 4:22 
 "Forever" - 5:13 
 "Goes Round and Round" - 5:08 
 "I'm Sorry" (Timothy Young) - 5:51 
 "Snakebite" (Fred Chalenor, Wayne Horvitz, Andy Roth, Timothy Young) - 5:30 
 "Second Time Around" - 4:34 
 "The Blue Rose" - 5:28 
Recorded at Litho in Seattle, Washington in July 1999

Personnel
Wayne Horvitz - Hammond B-3 organ, Nord Lead, DX-7, Roland JD-800, Wurlitzer electric piano
Timothy Young - guitar
Keith Lowe - electric bass
Andy Roth - drums

References

Knitting Factory Records albums
Wayne Horvitz albums
1999 albums